Flavio Martini (born 13 January 1945) is a former Italian road cyclist. As an amateur he won bronze medals in the 100 km team time trial at the 1967 and 1968 world championships and placed 31st in the individual road race at the 1968 Summer Olympics. After the Olympics he turned professional, but with little success.

References

External links
 

1945 births
Living people
Italian male cyclists
Olympic cyclists of Italy
Cyclists at the 1968 Summer Olympics
Cyclists from the Province of Padua